The values that a person holds may be personal or political depending on whether they are considered in relation to the individual or to society. Apart from moral virtue, examples of personal values include friendship, knowledge, beauty etc. and examples of political values, justice, equality and liberty. This article will outline some current ideas relating to the first group – personal values. It will begin by looking at the kinds of thing that have value and finish with a look at some of the theories that attempt to describe what value is.  Reference will be made solely to Western sources although it is recognised that many, if not all, of the values discussed may be universal.

Introduction

It is only in the last hundred years or so that the subject of value has become a subject of study in its own right, though the subject builds on the work of such earlier thinkers as Plato, Immanuel Kant and Jeremy Bentham. A new field of enquiry called "axiology" (from the Greek axios meaning "worth"), defined as "the philosophical study of goodness or value", began to emerge at around the beginning of the twentieth century, and its significance lay in extending the scope of the term "value" into fields other than traditional ethics.  R.H.Lotze, F.Brentano and G.E.Moore have been cited as early proponents of the subject, and to Moore is attributed the important distinction made between intrinsic and instrumental value, that is, between things that have value in themselves and things that might lead to something of value.

Examples of recent articles which introduce the subject include Mark Schroeder's Value Theory,  Elinor Mason's Value Pluralism and Michael Zimmerman's Intrinsic and Extrinsic Value. Schroeder defines axiology as being "primarily concerned with classifying what things are good", and, in accepting that there might be a number of things that can be valued or called good, he asks is there, underlying these, just one or is there more than one fundamental intrinsic value. Mason outlines two ways in which values have been considered in relation to one another: the first is called "monist", which maintains that there is just one intrinsic value to which all other values are auxiliary; and the second is called "pluralist", which maintains that there are many kinds of value and that the most important of these are irreducible to one another. Typical of the first school were the Utilitarians, such as Jeremy Bentham, who thought that all the values that a person might hold could be reduced to a desire for happiness or pleasure. Immanuel Kant, too, has been described as a monist in saying that the only good in itself lies in possessing a good will.  Regarding those holding pluralist views, Zimmerman in his book The Nature of Intrinsic Value (2012) gives some examples of more recent philosophers with lists of the kinds of thing that they thought had value:

Brentano (1889): Pleasure, Happiness, Love, Knowledge, Beauty, Proportion, Intention, Exercise, Virtue

Moore (1908) - Aesthetics, Affection, Knowledge, Consciousness, Pleasure, Virtue

Ross (1936) - Virtue, Pleasure, Knowledge, Artistic activity

In particular, Zimmerman singles out the work of William Frankena who, in his book Ethics (1963), gave a comprehensive list of values and who, besides suggesting the use of headings, began to group similar values together. It will be useful to discuss these in the following groups:

1. Beauty, harmony, proportion, aesthetic experience

2. Moral disposition, virtue, pleasure, happiness, contentment

3. Truth, knowledge, understanding, wisdom, honour, esteem

4. Life, health, strength, peace, security

5. Love, affection, friendship, cooperation

6. Power, achievement, freedom, adventure, novelty

Frankena, in formulating his list, builds on what he called the "classical triad" of beauty, goodness and truth and headings similar to these terms can be used to introduce a primary set of values as follows.

Primary values

Aesthetic values

Frankena in his list of values groups beauty with harmony, proportion and aesthetic experience. There are many different kinds of value that can be included in this category and Frankena himself distinguishes between "harmony and proportion in objects contemplated" and "harmony and proportion in one's own life". He refers to Plato who, firstly, in the Philebus suggests that aesthetic pleasure lies in the "beauty of colour and form", and secondly in the Republic that formal features like harmony and proportion are important not only to art and music but also to the "good life" which itself should contain "form", "variety" and "balance".

Another distinction results from the question of whether aesthetic value resides in the object contemplated or in the contemplative experience itself. James Shelley in his article The Concept of the Aesthetic notes that the term "aesthetic" in deriving from the Greek aesthesis, which means perception or awareness, tends towards the latter interpretation; George Dickie in his book Art and the Aesthetic charts the development of awareness and consciousness in their growing importance to aesthetic theory; and Zimmerman refers to G.E.Moore who wrote in relation to art and beauty that "by far the most valuable thing we know or can imagine are certain states of consciousness". Both Frankena and Nicolai Hartmann, who Frankena mentions, begin their lists of values with groups including consciousness, life and existence, and Hartmann makes reference to Nietzsche who considered that the value of beauty in art or nature lay in an increased awareness of life as an "affirmation of existence".

Shelley describes another concept apart from "immediacy" or "focussing one's attention on the subject" and this is the concept of "disinterestedness", a Kantian term which consists in looking at things objectively and impartially. He refers to Schopenhauer who realised that if perception were to be the only criterion of aesthetic value then, with a mind stripped of practical interest and cultural preconceptions, anything at all might be seen as beautiful: "One thing is only taken as more beautiful than another because it makes this pure contemplation easier", wrote Schopenhauer, a view criticised by Sartwell for making the term beauty, ultimately meaningless. Shelley, however, manages to elucidate various criteria of aesthetic value from such a standpoint: firstly, that there is value in simple formal relations, in harmony, grace and balance, and in fact in any other objective aspect that a good critic might care to point to; secondly, that there is value in recognising that people have natural tastes and preferences, whether, for example, they prefer "drama or comicality", or whether the work is striking in some way; and thirdly, that there is value in recognising the presence of "non-exhibited properties", realising that the work, or perception, is located within an "art-historical context" where only knowledge of, in Danto's terminology, an "artworld" can facilitate our feeling "the proper sentiments".

In addition to the views that aesthetic value lies either in the object or in the subjective experience there is a third view which suggests that value lies in some kind of engagement between the two. G.E.Moore wrote that it is neither in the "beautiful object" nor in the "conscious perception" where value is found but in the relationship between the two. Shelley too concludes with the idea that there is some reciprocal relationship between subject and object, his example being that of a Bartok quartet, where "a value originally belonging to the quartet has been transferred to the experience, before being reflected back, once again, onto the quartet."

Ethical values

The second group of values listed by Frankena includes happiness, virtue, pleasure, satisfaction and contentment – values traditionally associated with the field of ethics.  Zimmerman introduces Plato whose recurring concern was with the nature of the good, how we should live our lives, and whether it is pleasure or virtue that will lead to happiness.  Regarding pleasure, he considers food, drink and shelter to be simple goods – people value them, they value the work that goes into providing them and the pleasure that comes from enjoying them. Zimmerman after asking why eating should be considered a value refers to Aristotle who said that value resides in "the proper activity or functioning of things according to their nature" and that it is the "active exercising of man's faculties that give rise to pleasure".

Regarding virtue, Elinor Mason refers to J.S.Mill who made the distinction between lower values and higher values.  The distinction is that between efficient cause and final cause: whereas efficient cause includes hunger, thirst and the need for shelter, final cause arises from our having an overview of the relation of cause and effect whereby we can determine the end we want to achieve and then decide the means to achieve it.  If the end is well-being or happiness then such values as friendship, knowledge and beauty, as well as material sustenance, might be instrumental in achieving this.  Mason refers to G.E.Moore who, whilst recognising the virtues of "industry and temperance", recognised that there exists a "plurality of bearers of value". Love, beauty and friendship are intrinsic values (i.e. good in themselves) rather than instrumental values, and they do not lead in all cases necessarily either to pleasure or happiness.

Another significant writer on value, mentioned by both Frankena and Zimmerman, is John Dewey who questioned whether intrinsic values exist at all. All values for Dewey were instrumental. He compared life to an "ongoing stream" of cause and effect, which he called the "continuum of means and ends", where for example a lack of food leads to human activity leading to a further expenditure of energy, the need for more food and so on. He maintained, like Aristotle, that value lay in economy and in the efficient functioning of a human being in terms of a whole range of needs and wants.  These needs arise from a constant "interaction between a human being and his environment" and Dewey introduced the notion of having a "framework" of values to deal effectively with the various categories of being which contribute to our environment.

Cultural values

The third of the classical values – truth – is listed by Frankena alongside knowledge, understanding and wisdom. Given that "truth may never be fully known" he shifted the emphasis onto knowledge, and most lists of values now tend to include knowledge rather than truth as one of the primary values. Jesse Prinz in Culture and Cognitive Science took this further discussing the relativity of the terms knowledge and truth and the role that culture has in shaping knowledge.  This relativity is more pronounced in a second group listed by Frankena, a group which included the values of honour, esteem and good reputation. The link between the two groups was noted by Hartmann who realised that the terms "truth" and "truthfulness" involved two different, although related, kinds of value.  Whilst truth is associated with the values of knowledge and understanding, truthfulness is associated with the values of honesty, uprightness and integrity.

In his article, Prinz defines culture as a complex whole which includes knowledge, belief, art, morality and custom where the value associated with these things is acquired by people as members of society. This acquisition takes place through observing role models, imitating one's parents or learning through association with others. The telling of stories is mentioned and we may think of the value of books, whether fiction or non-fiction, and the worth of films or news programmes in disseminating knowledge and furthering understanding generally. Memory too has its place, and the importance of history in this respect is highlighted by Zimmerman who notes that some things may have value, not because they are beautiful or useful, but because they have meaning through either personal or cultural associations, for example a rare stamp or the pen with which Lincoln signed his letters.

Knowledge of both culture and subculture is important in understanding people's values.  Jacobson in an article on fitting attitudes tells us that what people find funny or shameful, honourable or dishonourable are culturally related, and he refers back to Brentano who introduced the related value of what is appropriate, suitable or fitting. Such values, however, can be considered not only from the point of view of a particular culture but from "the point of view of the universe" where integrating one's set of values with the principles of some higher truth ("selective copying" is the example he gives) may result in instances of non-conformity and other kinds of differentiation within society. The concept of "fittingness" introduces the value of integrity which Cox, La Caze and Levine discuss in their article Integrity [2001].  The concept is defined in terms of the relation between the different aspects of one's life – aesthetic, social, intellectual etc. – and in maintaining some sort of balance between them to give a sense of unity or wholeness. Views on integrity range from the practical requirements of honesty and truthfulness on the one hand, where Aristotle could write "with a true view all the data harmonise and with a false view the facts soon clash", to more general approaches regarding meaning and identity, or "wisdom and self-knowledge".

Secondary values

The end of the nineteenth and the beginning of the twentieth centuries saw an expansion in the number of values over and above the "classical" or primary values of beauty, goodness and truth. Some, like love, friendship and affection, clearly come from the Christian tradition and were discussed by philosophers like Moore and Brentano.  A more complex group revolving around concepts such as power, spirit and the will were introduced as values by Brentano and Hartmann and owe as much to the thoughts of Kant and Schopenhauer as they do to Christianity.  The emergence of a third group of values can be seen as a result of the expansion of the field away from traditional ethics, and in this group there begin to appear more material values – what Plato called the "goods of the body" – such as life, health and strength in the lists of Hartmann and Frankena.

Some early attempts were made at compiling a longer set of values and three of these can be mentioned here. R.B.Perry, referred to by Frankena, and whose work The General Theory of Value [1926] was called "the magnum opus of the new approach" by the Encyclopædia Britannica, increased the total number of categories by adding to the fields of aesthetics, ethics and knowledge the three further fields of religion, economics and politics; An earlier work, Lebensformen [1914], by the psychologist, Eduard Spranger, set out a similar list describing six types of personality, namely the Aesthetic, Economic, Theoretic, Religious, Social and Political; and Gordon Allport, who studied under Spranger, and who was mentioned in Peterson and Seligman's Character Strengths and Virtues [2004], together with Vernon and Lindzey, set out in their Study of Values [1950] six types of personality each of which was orientated towards a different set of values:

Personality
Aesthetic
Economic
Theoretic
Religious
Social
Political

Values
Harmony, Beauty, Artistry, Uniqueness
Usefulness, Resourcefulness, Practical
Truth, Intellectual, Cognitive
Faith, Unity, Holiness, Oneness
Love, Sympathy, Caring, Altruism
Power, Leadership, Influence, Competitiveness

These early links between philosophy and psychology have been discussed by C.B. Miller in his article entitled Empirical Approaches to Moral Character and this concluded with a look at the work of Peterson and Seligman. Their classification of values, "Values in Action" or VIA, arose from an empirical survey of virtues taken from around the world, which led to a six-fold classification, similar to the above, and comprising: Transcendence, Temperance, Wisdom, Justice, Humanity and Courage. Miller suggested, however, that no valid reason has been discovered as to why there should be six categories.

Regarding the content of these additional categories it is clear that their representative values differ according to who is compiling the list. One theory suggests that if the first three categories represent the cognitive or classical tradition, then the additional categories represent the non-cognitive – the "sentimental" or "emotivist" tradition – where neither the cognitive nor the non-cognitive necessarily takes primacy.  Zimmerman suggested that values taken from the latter viewpoint could be seen as just expressions of feeling or emotion about what is important.  A.M.Taylor in her paper, Investigation into Facts and Values [1983], suggested that there was a fundamental difference between values based on analytical understanding and values based on synthetic or "holistic" understanding.  The older values taken from the "aesthetic, moral and scientific spheres" were not enough and new categories would be required to include such concepts as "creativity, feeling and innovation". Jacobson also introduced a distinction between cognitive and non-cognitive values, and among the values derived from feeling or sentiment he included those of being "pride-worthy, shameful, funny and fearsome".  He mentioned David Hume in this respect who had used the three headings of "Pride and Humility", "Love and Hatred" and "Will and the Direct Passions" in the second volume of his Treatise of Human Nature and it will be useful to look at the second group of values in this order.

Material values

Frankena's list of values begins with a group that contains life, health and strength and in this he closely follows Hartmann. "Material goods" were discussed by Hartmann in the introductory section of his book,The Realm of Ethical Values [1926] in relation to wealth and economics.  Frankena mentions Plato who had referred to wealth, health and strength as "goods of the body".  Regarding wealth, Frankena, in a discussion of "money, cars and other material possessions", suggested that its value might be either instrumental or contributory, the latter term being defined in terms of "things that are good because they contribute to a good life or are parts of it". Money for a miser becomes part of his happiness, just as clothes, house or land may be a part of happiness for somebody else. Jacobson introduced the value of being "pride-worthy" and he mentioned David Hume who had noted that people take pride in, such "external advantages as ... country, family, children, gardens, houses, dogs and clothes".  Elinor Mason mentioned the practical wisdom of Aristotle who saw wealth as a matter of prudence, and who advised people to value and "not to neglect" what belongs to them.

Health on the other hand, in relation to the body and the mind, is usually thought of as an intrinsic value. Frankena, for example, wrote that we desire health "for its own sake", and Zimmerman wrote that "Being healthy is just a good way to be".  The value that we ascribe to life itself and the value of "just being" have been mentioned previously, but it was Hartmann who reintroduced the notion from earlier German philosophy that Being has a complementary category, namely that of Becoming.  Everything is subject to change over time, and without human intervention, is subject to deterioration and decay. In relation to this, Mason referred to Immanuel Kant one of whose principal values lay in duty, particularly, in this respect, duty to self, and looking after the "basic stuff" through physical exercise and maintenance.  Plato had also thought that the right way of living lay in "medicine, bathing and exercise" but Kant added to this idea by saying that value also lay in self-improvement through the cultivation of any "natural talents and gifts of fortune" that a person might possess.  James Griffin in his book on Well-Being [1986] similarly introduced the value of "accomplishment" and how, in Aristotle's terminology, we might grow and "flourish" in other ways.

Communal values

To the classical triad of beauty, goodness and truth various philosophers in the twentieth century began to add values from another large family: that of, in Frankena's words, "love, friendship, mutual affection and cooperation"; G.E.Moore added "love" to the values of beauty, moral quality and knowledge; and Jacobson added "friendship" to the values of beauty, pleasure and knowledge.  Moore, in reflecting Christianity's emphasis on the importance of love, suggested that " ... the love of love is by far the most valuable good we know ... more complicated than beauty ... more complicated than knowledge".  Both Frankena and Zimmerman mentioned Plato, who had outlined various kinds of love in the Symposium,  and who had described sympatheia or coaffection, as "filling men with affection ... kindness ... friendship ... forgiveness".  For Plato, the soul was the seat of love and the affections, and its value lay in recognising the "community of feeling among mankind".  Jacobson referred to David Hume who similarly linked love with sympathy, the latter feeling arising from "the great resemblance among human creatures".

On a more practical level, Bernard Gert in his work on The Definition of Morality [2002] introduced the notion of "loyalty" as a factor in establishing a sense of community among family and kinship groups.  Regarding wider society, Gert mentioned Kant who distinguished between the values of not harming other people on the one hand and performing positive, charitable acts on the other.  Zimmerman also mentioned Kant and his view that the only thing that is good without qualification is goodwill or benevolence.  Kant had defined friendship as "the coming together of two persons through mutual love, each particating and sharing their lives in a sympathetic manner".  He also introduced the concept of "respect" by which he meant keeping an appropriate distance from others within the community, and he talked of community itself in terms of "being able to communicate ... to perfect social intercourse ... and to cultivate a disposition of... reciprocity ... agreeableness ... courtesy ... hospitality".

Communication was introduced as a separate value by Perry; and Hartmann, after working through the primary values, introduced a "second group" which included not only "brotherly love" but also "social intercourse".  Frankena introduced Aquinas who had stressed the value of communication in human relationships saying that "there are close parallels between the communication of words and that between lover and beloved".  Gert too realised that there was value in "interpersonal interaction" but queried how such a value could apply in the absence of other people, for example, on a desert island.  Frankena answered the question by widening the scope of love to include love of, or communion with, God, animals, nature and the environment.

Spiritual values

Towards the end of his list, Frankena included the values of power and achievement, freedom, adventure and novelty.  Regarding freedom, he introduced Schopenhauer who saw life as a continuous engagement with the realm of strife, a struggle against desire and the "primal will", where the only moments of freedom that a person may have lay in art, music and spiritual contemplation. Strength and freedom of the will were values for Hartmann too, and also for Kant who, as Zimmerman noted, saw such freedom lying in the absence of coercion either from external agencies of from internal "sensuous impulses". These latter included emotions such as desire, fear, hope and anger, whose value, or power, lay, according to Aristotle, in moving a person either towards or away from some perceived object.  Griffin distinguished between desire itself and "informed desire", where the value of the latter lay in stirring the mind, not involuntarily through emotion and natural inclination, but through the voluntary power of the will.  Attitudes can be controlled through strength of mind, courage and self-discipline, and "corrected", according to Brentano, through an informed choice about what is right, fitting or appropriate.

Frankena recorded that his list included "all the things that Hartmann mentions", but it is notable that Hartmann completed his list with what he called "spiritual goods" such as "love of the remote" and, in a Nietzschian phrase, "radiant virtue".  Love of the remote referred to either love of the wilderness or love of God, but Michael Stocker in Plural and Conflicting Values [1990]  suggested that value lay more, as Plato had said, not in love but in the "contemplation" of God or of what is good: "He who proceeds aright", said Plato, "should begin in youth to visit beautiful places ... to contemplate the vast sea ... until on that shore he grows and waxes strong".  In the Jewish tradition it was not so much the sea that bestowed strength, but the hills,  and Griffin referred to those who value mountains for the excitement or the sublimity that they might afford.  Frankena referred to the values of adventure and novelty that A.N.Whitehead had introduced, but it was Ralph Waldo Emerson in the previous century who had written about the inspirational value of new things and of travel, not only for the sake of art or study, but for the value of the experience itself.  Hartmann suggested that it might be a great work of art such as a cathedral or a piece of music that might be inspiring, and he mentioned Nietzsche who wrote regarding art: "What does all art do? Does it not select? Does it not highlight? By doing these art strengthens certain values ... It is the great stimulus of life".  Alternatively it might be humour that lifts the spirits and Jacobson discusses the value that different kinds of humour, such as being funny or being amusing might merit.

Theories of value

Various theories have been put forward in the West to try and define what a value "is" – as opposed to saying what kinds of value a thing may "have".  There are generally held to be three kinds of theory at present that attempt to answer the question of what a value is and these have been borrowed from the field of ethics.  Each group of theories tends to concentrate on different aspects of the subject so that if ethics can be defined as, say, the principles governing the conduct of a person then the first group of theories (ontology and deontology) looks at the principles themselves, the second group of theories (teleology and consequentialism) looks at the aims and outcomes of conduct, and the third group of theories (virtue ethics and fitting-attitude theory) looks at the concept of the person, their character and attitudes.

Ontology and deontology

Ontology (from the Greek Ontos meaning "being" or "that which is") is that branch of metaphysics which deals with being, and, particularly in relation to value theory, with the "ontological categories" or plain categories of being.  Zimmerman mentions G.E.Moore who pointed out that before discussing what we ought to value we should consider the possibility that anything that exists might be of value to somebody: "If we recognise that anything whatever may be good ... we start with a much more open mind".  Zimmerman introduced the concept of "supervenience" through which it is held that any structuring of our values will reflect the structuring of the underlying categories of being themselves.  Kant is mentioned by Zimmerman in this respect, and also Christine Korsgaard who, drawing on Kant's distinction between things-in-themselves and the relation between things, draws a similar distinction between intrinsic values (values in virtue of "non-relational properties") and extrinsic values (values in virtue of "relational properties").  Regarding the former an impasse is reached when all that can be said of intrinsic values is, in Moore's words, that goodness "just is", or in Zimmerman's words that pleasure "just is".  This has led to some, like Monroe Beardsley, to say that only extrinsic values, in the final analysis, exist.  Different kinds of extrinsic value in this model derive from the different underlying categories of relation, the example given being those of beauty, utility and meaning, each of which is supervenient on one of Kant's three categories of relation, namely disjunction, causality and inherence respectively.

Deontology, on the other hand, (from the Greek Deon meaning "duty") is the branch of ethics that bases value on moral principles which in turn form a guide to knowing what "ought" to be done in various situations. The problem in philosophy of moving from an "is" to an "ought" (the "Is-ought problem") is said to have been introduced into philosophy by David Hume. Richmond Campbell, in discussing this, asks how one might move from a knowledge of what exists, i.e. from a whole range of possible values, to a knowledge of which, among these, one ought to value.  Given that "a small number of core moral values are espoused universally" the answer would appear to lie in giving priority to those which do not "conflict". Frankena suggested that these moral principles are derived from three main sources: the prevailing moral rules of a culture; divine revelation as found in the holy texts; and logical or metaphysical deduction.  Kant's categorical imperative is given as an example of the latter, although Frankena pointed out that a distinction would need to be made between arguments of logical necessity, i.e. those which contain no contradictions, and arguments of logical sufficiency which would be needed to account for the various kinds of value, whether "aesthetic, prudential or logical".

Teleology and consequentialism

Mark Schroeder in his article on Value Theory considers consequentialism to be "under the umbrella" of teleology,  where the latter can be defined as that branch of metaphysics which deals with the final end or purpose of things (the Greek Telos meaning "the end or purpose of an action").  According to this group of theories things are instrumentally valuable which help to achieve either specific or general ends, and underlying this, Schroeder tells us, is the relation of cause and effect.  Frankena defined instrumental value as that which is good or useful for some purpose and he referred to Aristotle who, besides defining different kinds of cause, defined the good as "that at which all things aim".  If for example the aim is to live a good life those things will be good or valuable which constitute the means for achieving such an end. However, what is good for a specific person and what is good for the world as a whole are two different things and are reflected, according to Schroeder, in the ideas of egoism and consequentialism respectively.  Regarding the latter, Zimmerman writes that a value is good because of a perceived final end in which "all the consequences taken as a whole are good".

Regarding the end at which people aim, Bentham, according to Elinor Mason, thought that the sole end was that of "pleasure", and that all other values such as beauty, friendship, knowledge etc. could be measured in accordance with the quantity of pleasure which each might afford.  John Stuart Mill suggested that there were lower and higher pleasures and that these were fundamentally incommensurable. He went on to question, like Plato, whether the values of pleasure or satisfaction were in fact the ends at which intelligent people should aim.  Mason also refers to James Griffin who was of the opinion that "well-being" was a better name for such an end, and which he saw in terms of "flourishing" or a "maximisation of life" in all its aspects.  A "balancing of elements" is required whereby those activities which we value for well-being, such as work, rest, love, solitude, health, accomplishment etc. should be considered "in various combinations" in order to afford a "framework" or a "plan of life" for ourselves.  This way of thinking was called by Elizabeth Anderson, in her article on John Dewey, "objective list theory" as opposed to theories like Bentham's based on pleasure or those of  Dewey based on "informed desire".  Dewey rejected the notion of a final end arguing instead that the "value of means and ends are reciprocally determined".  According to Zimmerman, he challenged traditional metaphysical ideas with a more "pragmatic" approach saying that only through "calm, informed reflection" on the ways in which people "interact with the environment" and deal with the ensuing consequences can value be ascertained.

Virtue ethics and fitting-attitude theory

Mason in her article on Value Pluralism introduces virtue ethics as a third way of thinking about the subject of value and describes it as being based on how a person should "be" rather than what a person should "do".  Frankena had similarly introduced an "ethics of virtue" as a third approach (following deontology and consequentialism), suggesting that there were two kinds of things that we can value: either the things around us like knowledge or physical objects; or the things inside us like our disposition, attitudes and emotions.  Among the latter were the virtues and these he defined as dispositions to act in certain ways.  Regarding the virtues, we can either value them in their own right or we can ask whether they tell us something about the nature of value itself. Hursthouse and Pettigrew deal with the first of these options in their article on Virtue ethics, asking questions like "how many virtues are there" and "how do they relate to each other".  C.B.Miller, on the other hand, in his article on moral character points to recent work which suggests that the categories used to structure the virtues are the same as those that can be used to structure values. The six "core virtues" listed by Peterson and Seligman have been found to be useful, for example, in the structuring of values in their "Values in Action" or VAI.

One of the similarities between virtue theory and fitting-attitude theory is that they both approach the subject of value through an emphasis on the agent.  They are "agent-centred" rather than "act-centred" theories, but whereas virtues are defined purely as a disposition to act, fitting-attitude theory embraces the act as well within its field of consideration. Roderick Chisholm in his book, Brentano and Intrinsic Value [1986] suggested that value lies, for example, not just in virtue but in "individuals acting virtuously" or not just in pleasure but in "individuals experiencing pleasure".  However, just as there is conceived to be a necessary interaction between the agent and the environment so there is, in other circumstances, a necessary engagement between the agent and an object. Jacobson in his article on Fitting-Attitude Theory suggests that there is a reciprocity between "facts about human nature" and "facts about the object", and that "to be valuable" requires either that one's "feelings are adequate to the object", or that "the object is "fitting" in respect of some particular attitude.  The concept of fittingness, or what might fit together, is extended to the relation between different values and, in particular, the possible conflicts between them, the examples given being between that of humour and good taste, or between what is considered funny and what is considered fair or just. Both Mason and Zimmerman discuss the problem of conflicting values, as did Philippa Foot who, in the field of virtue ethics, suggested that the answer to possible conflict lay in bringing the virtues, or values, into relation with one another saying "that even such concepts as love and justice can become dangerously distorted" if not tempered with a consideration of other fundamental values.

References

Western culture
Axiology